Gloria Lee (March 22, 1926 – December 3, 1962) was an American airline flight attendant and a follower of Oahspe who became part of the 1950s contactee movement in 1953.

Lee, a native of Los Angeles, claimed to be in telepathic communication with an entity known as JW, who lived on the planet Venus, and began to assemble a book of his spiritual teachings as dictated to her. At his direction she founded the Cosmon Research Foundation for the purpose of publication and study of JW's superhuman wisdom, much of which bore some resemblance to the 1882 teachings of Oahspe.

Membership in Lee's organization rose sharply after advertisements were regularly carried in Ray Palmer's monthly occult magazine Fate. She hit the contactee lecture circuit and attracted considerable public attention. During her lectures, Lee sold copies of her book of revelations, Why We Are Here! (1959). The year of her death, a second "JW" book was published, The Changing Conditions of Your World! (1962). 

She developed a plan for world peace and a space station design and took them to Washington D.C. in late 1962 in an attempt to bring them to the attention of officials. However, after being rebuffed, she launched a hunger strike or protest fast, telling others in the UFO contactee community that she expected to enter a coma resembling death, then "return" with renewed spiritual energy to carry on her "great work". However, the press were not notified of Lee's hunger strike until some time after it had begun, and she attracted no publicity. After approximately 66 days without eating, she was taken to George Washington University Hospital. She died there on December 3, 1962 at the age of 36.

Mark-Age
After her death, Charles Boyd Gentzel, the founder of Mark-Age, Inc., and his partner Pauline Sharpe (also known as Nada-Yolanda), claimed to be channelling spirit messages from Lee on behalf of their own UFO-contact cult. Lee is not the only contactee or would-be contactee to starve herself to death. In November 1982, LaVerne Landis, a member of the UFO cult Search and Prove, died of starvation while waiting in her car in the northern Minnesota woods for over 40 days for a flying saucer to land, after reportedly being told to wait there during psychic contact with a Space Brother.

References

External links
 Survey of 1950s contactees, including Lee
 1963 newsletter from contactee Daniel Fry announcing Lee's death
 General Overview of 1950s Contactees
 Mark-Age, Inc.

1926 births
1962 deaths
People from Los Angeles
UFO religions
Contactees
People who died on hunger strike
UFO writers